Yatseno is a rural locality in Mashkinsky Selsoviet Rural Settlement, Konyshyovsky District, Kursk Oblast, Russia. Population:

Geography 
The village is located on the Belichka River (a left tributary of the Svapa River), 66 km from the Russia–Ukraine border, 61 km north-west of Kursk, 11 km north-east of the district center – the urban-type settlement Konyshyovka, 3 km from the selsoviet center – Mashkino.

 Climate
Yatseno has a warm-summer humid continental climate (Dfb in the Köppen climate classification).

Transport 
Yatseno is located 59.5 km from the federal route  Ukraine Highway, 36 km from the route  Crimea Highway, 33 km from the route  (Trosna – M3 highway), 16 km from the road of regional importance  (Fatezh – Dmitriyev), on the road  (Konyshyovka – Zhigayevo – 38K-038), on the road of intermunicipal significance  (38K-005 – Verkhoprudka), 4.5 km from the nearest railway halt 552 km (railway line Navlya – Lgov-Kiyevsky).

The rural locality is situated 67 km from Kursk Vostochny Airport, 165 km from Belgorod International Airport and 267 km from Voronezh Peter the Great Airport.

References

Notes

Sources

Rural localities in Konyshyovsky District